The narrow-gauge railroad of Caprolactam factory in Datchnij settlement is the only railway in Russia hauling salt trains. Is located in Dzerzhinsk.

Current status 
The locomotive depot is located at the chemical plant "Caprolactam" which is located in the city of Dzerzhinsk, Nizhny Novgorod Oblast. The main task of the narrow-gauge railway is transporting salt from a nearby pier to the chemical plant in the industrial zone. Traffic on the railway varies each day, depending on how much salt must be delivered to the factory, but usually not less than four per day.

Rolling stock

Locomotives 
TU8 – №0393
TU7A – №3272, №2892, №2913, №2136 и ТУ7 – №2557

Railroad car
Flatcar
Tank car
Snow blower

See also
Narrow-gauge railways in Russia

References and sources

External links
 Official Website (Russian language)
  (Russian language)
 «The site of the railroad» S. Bolashenko (Russian language)
 Narrow gauge railway of Caprolactam factory (interactive map) (English language)

750 mm gauge railways in Russia
Rail transport in Nizhny Novgorod Oblast